The Four Holy Beasts (四靈 or 四聖獣) are Chinese astronomical and cultural Four Benevolent Animals that are spread in the East Asian cultural sphere (including Vietnam and the Philippines). They are mentioned in the Chinese classic Book of Rites and includes the Dragon (龍) in the East, the Qilin (麟) in the West, the Turtle (龜) in the North, and the Phoenix (鳳) in the South.

Differences 

The Four Holy Beasts differs from  Four Symbols in that Qilin replaces the White Tiger.  The Four Symbols are the Azure Dragon (青龍) in the East, White Tiger (白虎) in the West, Vermilion Bird (朱雀) in the South, and the Black Tortoise (玄武) in the North.

Regional examples

Vietnam
In Ho Chi Minh City, there are four areas named after the beasts in Suối Tiên Park. They are the Thuỷ Long(水龍) Palace, the Kỳ Lân(麒麟) Palace, the Kim Quy(金龜) Lake, and the Phượng Hoàng(鳳凰) Palace.

China
Summer Palace has statues of the four Beasts.

Korea
Patterns of the four holy beasts are found in Bronze mirrors of the Goryeo dynasty and Pottery.

Gallery

See also 
 Four Symbols

References

Chinese legendary creatures